City Place I is a 38-story,  skyscraper at 185 Asylum Street in Hartford, Connecticut. It is the tallest building in the state, and two meters taller than Travelers Tower, built in 1919. City Place I was designed by Skidmore, Owings & Merrill, and completed in 1980.  The majority of the building is office space, though there are various restaurant and retail establishments found on the lower floors.

The building was sold on April 2, 2012 to CommonWealth REIT, a real estate investment trust based in Newton, Massachusetts, for $99 million, by the original owner, CityPlace LLC. This price is approx. $112 per square foot.

See also
List of tallest buildings in Hartford
List of tallest buildings by U.S. state

References

Skyscraper office buildings in Connecticut
Skidmore, Owings & Merrill buildings
Skyscrapers in Hartford, Connecticut
1980 establishments in Connecticut
Office buildings completed in 1980